Iørn Peter Uldbjerg (born February 1, 1968) is a retired Danish football (soccer) player, who most prominently won the 1993 Danish football championship with FC København. He began his senior career at Tårnby Boldklub and played six games for the Denmark national under-21 football team in 1988, before signing a professional contract with B 1903. He started playing for FC København when the club was founded in 1992, and after leaving the club in 1998, he ended his career at Herfølge BK and Farum BK.

Uldbjerg was part of the Herfølge squad that won the 1999–2000 Danish Superliga.

References

External links
 FB
 Peders fodboldstatistik profile
 Profile on SuperStats

1968 births
Living people
Danish men's footballers
F.C. Copenhagen players
Herfølge Boldklub players
FC Nordsjælland players

Association football midfielders
FA 2000 managers
AB Tårnby players